Gold, Frankincense and Myrrh (Mirisi, zlato i tamjan) is a 1971 Croatian film directed by Ante Babaja. It is based on the novel of the same name by Slobodan Novak.

References

External links
 

1971 films
1970s Croatian-language films
Films directed by Ante Babaja
Jadran Film films
Films based on Croatian novels
Croatian drama films
Croatian black-and-white films
1971 drama films
Yugoslav drama films